The Minardi M194 was a Formula One car designed by Aldo Costa and Gustav Brunner and built by Minardi for the 1994 season. It was introduced at that year's Canadian Grand Prix to replace the Minardi M193B. The car was again powered by the Ford HBD V8 engine.

Minardi team drivers during 1994 were Pierluigi Martini and former Grand Prix winner Michele Alboreto. The team's test driver was Luca Badoer.

The M194 would only score two points during its 11 races, both when Martini finished in 5th place at the car's second race, the French Grand Prix. The team in fact scored more points in 1994 (3 points) using the M193B than with the M194. The combined 5 point total saw Minardi only finish tenth in the Constructors' Championship.

The M194 was replaced for the  season by the Minardi M195. Alboreto retired and was replaced by test driver Badoer.

Livery 
The M194 had a blue, orange and white livery, with main sponsorship from Lucchini and Beta Tools.

During the British Grand Prix, the car ran with the words Italia IN - Ireland OUT, in response to the elimination of Ireland from the 1994 World Cup and the provocation from Eddie Jordan in the previous race.

Race results
(key)

* 3 points scored using Minardi M193B

References

1994 Formula One season cars
Minardi Formula One cars